Nicolas Atalah (born 11 September 1938) is a Chilean former sports shooter. He competed in the skeet event at the 1968 Summer Olympics.

References

1938 births
Living people
Chilean male sport shooters
Olympic shooters of Chile
Shooters at the 1968 Summer Olympics
Sportspeople from Viña del Mar
Pan American Games medalists in shooting
Pan American Games bronze medalists for Chile
Shooters at the 1967 Pan American Games
20th-century Chilean people